The Women's Football Alliance (WFA) is a professional full-contact Women's American football tackle minor league that began play in 2009. It is the largest 11-on-11 football league for women in the world, and the longest running active women's football league in the U.S. Since 2016, the league has operated with three competitive levels: Pro, Division 2 and Division 3. The league is owned and operated by Jeff King and Lisa Gibbons King of Exeter, California. Lisa King is also a wide receiver for the WFA's, Cali War.

In addition to operating annual national championship seasons in the United States, the league also operates the WFA International program which organizes international competitions for its own Team United and Team World against each other and all-star teams from other nations. The program also supports international player exchanges and provides logistical support to women's tackle football leagues in Central and South America, Europe, and Africa.

League history
The Women's Football Alliance was established in 2009 and began its inaugural season with 36 teams. Many of the teams were already established teams from other leagues such as Women's Professional Football League, Independent Women's Football League and National Women's Football Association, while others began their inaugural season of play in the WFA.

2009
The first season of play ended with a championship game, which was played in the rebuilding (post-Katrina) city of New Orleans, Louisiana and was hosted by the New Orleans Blaze. The game was between the St. Louis Slam (American Conference – St. Louis, MO) and the West Michigan Mayhem (National Conference – Kalamazoo, MI). St. Louis became the first WFA National Champions with a final game score of 21–14. Additionally, there was an International Game played between the Aguilas Regias of Monterrey, Mexico and the hosting team, New Orleans Blaze. The Blaze won this game 12–0.

2010
The WFA grew in the second year (2010) to have over 40 teams competing for the national championship. The national championship for the 2010 season was accompanied by the first All-American game. The term All-American is used by the WFA to represent the best players at all positions from all WFA teams. The teams were chosen partly based on statistics and partly based on the vote of head coaches. The All-American game was played just before the championship game in Las Vegas, Nevada and was hosted by the Las Vegas Showgirlz. The All-American game was won by the American Conference. The second championship in the WFA would again come down to the last few plays and have a score differential of only four points. The Lone Star Mustangs (American Conference – Dallas/Fort Worth) defeated the Columbus Comets (National Conference – Columbus, Ohio) to become the second National Champions of the WFA by a score of 16–12.

2011
As the Women's Football Alliance prepared for the 2011 season, they were scheduled to have over 60 teams playing across the United States. They again grew due in part to new teams starting and in part due to established teams moving in from other leagues, most notably the New York Sharks, D.C. Divas, Chicago Force, Dallas Diamonds, and Kansas City Tribe. In the 2011 WFA championship, which was held in Bedford, Texas, the Boston Militia defeated the San Diego Surge 34–19 to claim the title.

2012
The WFA opened the season with 60 teams. The 2012 WFA National Championship game took place at Heinz Field in Pittsburgh, Pennsylvania, home stadium of the NFL franchise Pittsburgh Steelers; it was the first women's football championship game to be played in an NFL stadium. After losing the title game in the previous season, the San Diego Surge returned to win the 2012 championship 40–36 over the Chicago Force.

2013
The WFA opened the season with 50 teams. Running back Whitney Zelee (Boston Militia) made headlines in 2013 by becoming the league's first player to surpass 2,000 rushing yards in a football season, setting a league record of 2,128 yards. After losing the title game in the previous season, the Chicago Force returned to win the 2013 championship over the Dallas Diamonds 81–34 at Balboa Stadium, San Diego, California.

2014
The WFA opened the season with 42 teams. The preseason was capped by the inaugural WFA International Bowl, in which the Mexican All-Stars defeated the Austin Outlaws in exhibition. The Boston Militia became the league's first two-time champion in 2014, winning 69–34 in a title rematch with the San Diego Surge at Lane Tech Stadium in Chicago, Illinois. During championship weekend, the league introduced a new mid-major bowl game: the Alliance Bowl. The Seattle Majestics of the American Conference faced the Indy Crash of the National Conference in a contest to "showcase of the depth of quality teams that exist in the Women's Football Alliance." The Indy Crash prevailed 26–12. This season was also notable for the introduction of Kenneth Massey Ratings into the league's playoffs system.

2015
The WFA opened the season with 40 teams, the fewest since the league was first established in 2009. The preseason concluded with the second WFA International Bowl Game Series, in which the Mexican All-Stars went 1–1, defeating the Tacoma Trauma before falling to the Seattle Majestics. On August 8, 2015, the D.C. Divas defeated the Dallas Elite 30–26 in the WFA National Championship game at Los Angeles (Calif.) Southwest College Stadium. The Central Cal War Angels beat the Atlanta Phoenix 28–8 in the Alliance Bowl, an invitational bowl game also held during championship weekend.

2016
WFA executives launched a new, tiered league structure consisting of three divisions, similar to that of NCAA Football. The league opened the season with 43 teams (11 in Division 1, 16 in Division 2, and 16 in Division 3). The WFA also announced the W Bowl as their new brand for the WFA National Championship game. With a 28–26 victory over the Dallas Elite, the D.C. Divas won the inaugural W Bowl  and their second national championship in as many years. The St. Louis Slam downed the Tampa Bay Inferno 38–7 to claim the Division 2 championship. The Acadiana Zydeco defeated the Richmond Black Widows 20–18 in the Division 3 title game. All three games were played at Joe P. Michaela Stadium in Imperial, Pa. 

Allison Cahill of the Boston Renegades reached a new milestone in sports by becoming the first quarterback to attain 100 victories playing exclusively in women's football leagues.

2017
The league expanded to 65 teams (15 in Division 1, 19 in Division 2, and 31 in Division 3). On July 22, the Dallas Elite claimed the Division 1 National Championship, dubbed W Bowl II, with a 31–21 outcome against the Boston Renegades at Highmark Stadium in Pittsburgh, Pennsylvania. The St. Louis Slam repeated as Division 2 champions after a rematch in the title game against Tampa Bay finished 42–15. The Arkansas Wildcats beat the Orlando Anarchy 42–26 to claim the Division 3 trophy.

2018
The league opened the season with 67 teams (9 in Division 1, 16 in Division 2, and 39 in Division 3). On July 28, the Boston Renegades won the Division 1 National Championship game  42–18 over the Los Angeles Warriors at Fifth Third Bank Stadium, Kennesaw State University in Kennesaw, Georgia. The game was broadcast on ESPN3. The New York Sharks claimed the Division 2 title with a 27–21 victory over the Minnesota Vixen. In a rematch of the 2017 Division 3 championship game, the Orlando Anarchy defeated the Arkansas Wildcats 46–0.

2019
The league opened with 62 teams (6 in Division 1, 18 in Division 2, and 38 in Division 3). The Boston Renegades repeated as league champions, matching the feat first accomplished by the D.C. Divas (2015, 2016). On July 13, Boston beat the Cali War 52–24 at the Colorado School of Mines in Golden, Colorado. The game was broadcast on ESPN3. The St. Louis Slam won their third Division 2 title in four years by downing the Detroit Dark Angels 34–0. The Orlando Anarchy made their third consecutive trip to the Division 3 championship game but fell to the Nevada Storm 62–45.

2020
The 2020 season of the Women's Football Alliance was cancelled in its entirety due to health and safety concerns in regards to the COVID-19 (Coronavirus) pandemic. Although regular season games were scheduled, none were played.

The WFA signed deals with Eleven Sports/FTF Next Sports Network to broadcast ten 'WFA Game of the Week' events and eight games from the 2019 season on its cable network, streaming channels and website. They also established partnerships with Secret, Xenith, Wilson, Glazier Clinics, and Florida State University Interdisciplinary Center for Athletic Coaching.

The WFA established the Women's Football Coaching Alliance (WFCA), and the 'WFA Gives Campaign'. The league also witnessed the release of two feature films focused on its players, "Born To Play," directed by Viridiana Lieberman, and "Open Field," directed by Kathy Kuras. "Born To Play" aired nationally on ESPN and internationally on ABC to widespread critical acclaim.

2021
In February, the WFA announced a five-year agreement with the Hall of Fame Resort and Entertainment Company for the league's championship games to be played at Tom Benson Hall of Fame Stadium at Hall of Fame Village in Canton, Ohio. The league resumed play after a 2020 season lost to global pandemic. Scheduling challenges and safety concerns necessitated a delayed start (May instead of April) and a shortened season (6 regular season games instead of 8). The 2021 season opened with 49 teams (7 in Division 1, 12 in Division 2, and 30 in Division 3). On July 24, the Boston Renegades collected their third consecutive league title with a 42–26 victory over the Minnesota Vixen. The Nevada Storm defeated the Detroit Dark Angels 42–18 to win the Division 2 title. The Derby City Dynamite claimed the Division 3 crown with a 30–20 victory over the Arizona Outkast. All three championship games and the 2021 All-American game were broadcast on Next Level Sports television channel and FTF Next streaming channel.

2022
Heading into the 2022 season, the WFA rebranded Division 1 as the Pro Division and labeled the level as "WFA Pro." The league started the season with 59 teams: 11 in the Pro Division, 12 in Division 2, and 27 in Division 3. The league also added a developmental level that launched with nine teams.

The league's championship games again took place at Tom Benson Hall of Fame Stadium at Hall of Fame Village in Canton, Ohio. On July 10, the Boston Renegades collected their fourth consecutive league title with a 32–12 victory over the Minnesota Vixen. On July 9, the Mile High Blaze defeated the Derby City Dynamite 21–20 to win the Division 2 title, and the Oklahoma City Lady Force claimed the Division 3 crown with a 25–0 victory over the Capital City Savages. The National Conference won the All-American Game 14-12.

For the first time, the WFA Pro National Championship Game was broadcast on ESPN2. AdeNation was the name sponsor for the championship game while Xenith sponsored the WFA All-American Game. The WFA also signed a multi-year licensing deal with Fathead  and brought back "The Road To Canton" television show for a second season.

WFA Teams

Women's Football Alliance 2022 Season Active Teams (64)

Expansion 2023 and inactive teams

WFA PRO Championship Game results

WFA Division II Championship Game results

WFA Division III Championship Game results

Alliance Bowl results

Alliance Bowl Midwest Region results

See also
 American football in the United States
 Women's Football in the United States
 List of leagues of American football
 List of female American football players

References

External links
 

 
Sports leagues established in 2008
Professional sports leagues in the United States
Women's American football leagues
2008 establishments in the United States